Armstrong's axioms are a set of references (or, more precisely, inference rules) used to infer all the functional dependencies on a relational database. They were developed by William W. Armstrong in his 1974 paper. The axioms are sound in generating only functional dependencies in the closure of a set of functional dependencies (denoted as  ) when applied to that set (denoted as ). They are also complete in that repeated application of these rules will generate all functional dependencies in the closure . 

More formally, let  denote a relational scheme over the set of attributes  with a set of functional dependencies .

Then, a set of inference rules  is sound if and only if the following holds:

The set of inference rules  is said to be complete if the following holds:

Axioms (primary rules)
Let  be a relation scheme over the set of attributes .

Axiom of reflexivity
Hereby,  holds  [] means that  functionally determines .
If  then .

Axiom of augmentation
It means that attribute in dependencies does not change the basic dependencies.
If , then  for any .

Axiom of transitivity
If  holds  and  holds , then  holds . 

Additional rules (Secondary Rules)

These rules can be derived from the above axioms.

Decomposition

Proof

Composition

If  and  then .

Proof

Union (Notation)

If  and  then .

Proof

Pseudo transitivity

If  and  then .

Proof

Self determination

 for any . This follows directly from the axiom of reflexivity.

Extensivity

The following property is a special case of augmentation when .
If , then .
Extensivity can replace augmentation as axiom in the sense that augmentation can be proved from extensivity together with the other axioms.

Proof

Armstrong relation
Given a set of functional dependencies , an Armstrong relation is a relation which satisfies all the functional dependencies in the closure  and only those dependencies. Unfortunately, the minimum-size Armstrong relation for a given set of dependencies can have a size which is an exponential function of the number of attributes in the dependencies considered.

References

External links
 UMBC CMSC 461 Spring '99
 CS345 Lecture Notes from Stanford University

Data modeling